Robert Harry Lowie (born ; June 12, 1883 – September 21, 1957) was an Austrian-born American anthropologist. An expert on Indigenous peoples of the Americas, he was instrumental in the development of modern anthropology and has been described as "one of the key figures in the history of anthropology".

Early life and education
Lowie was born and spent the first ten years of his life in Vienna, Austria-Hungary, but came to the United States in 1893. He studied at the College of the City of New York, where in 1896 he met and befriended Paul Radin while taking a BA in Classical Philology in 1901. After a short stint as a teacher, he began studying chemistry at Columbia University, but soon switched to anthropology under the tutelage of Franz Boas, Livingston Farrand and Clark Wissler. Influenced by Wissler, Lowie began his first fieldwork on the Lemhi Reservation in Idaho with the Northern Shoshone in 1906. He graduated (Ph.D.) in 1908. with a dissertation titled "“The Test-Theme in North American Mythology".

Career 
In 1909, he became assistant curator to Clark Wissler at the American Museum of Natural History, New York. During his time there, Lowie became a specialist in American Indians, being active in field research, particularly in several excursions to the Great Plains. This work led in particular to his identification with the Crow Indians. In 1917, he became assistant professor at the University of California, Berkeley. From 1925 until his retirement in 1950, he was professor of anthropology at Berkeley, where, along with Alfred Louis Kroeber, he was a central figure in anthropological scholarship.

Lowie undertook several expeditions to the Great Plains, where he conducted ethnographic fieldwork at the Absarokee (Crow, 1907, 1910–1916, 1931), Arikaree, Hidatsa, Mandan and Shoshone (1906, 1912–1916). Shorter research expeditions led him to the southwestern United States, the Great Basin and to South America where he was inspired by Curt Nimuendajú. The focus of some of Lowie's work was salvage ethnography, the rapid collection of data from cultures close to extinction.

Ruth Benedict and Robert Lowie were both commissioned during World War II to write a piece about an enemy during wartime by the United States Office of War Information. Unlike Benedict's Chrysanthemum and the Sword in which she describes the culture of Japan without ever having set foot in Japan, Lowie could at least draw on his recollections from the German-speaking world of his childhood. In his book The German People: A Social Portrait to 1914, Lowie took a cautious approach and stressed his ignorance of what was going on in his country of origin at this time. Once the war ended, Lowie made several short trips to Germany.

Influences 
Together with Alfred Kroeber, Lowie was one of the first generation of students of Franz Boas. His theoretical orientation was within the Boasian mainstream of anthropological thought, emphasizing cultural relativism and opposed to the cultural evolutionism of the Victorian era. Like many prominent anthropologists at the time, including Boas, his scholarship originated in the school of German idealism and romanticism espoused by earlier thinkers such as Kant, Georg Hegel and Johann Gottfried Herder. Lowie, somewhat stronger than his mentor Boas, emphasized historical components and the element of variability in his works. For him, cultures were not finished constructs, but always changing and he stressed the idea that cultures could interact.

In 1919, Lowie published Primitive Society, which "criticized the hypothetical reconstruction of the stages of the evolution of civilization as postulated by Lewis H. Morgan". The book has been seen as a key text in the promotion of theories of social organization in anthropology, being praised by Alfred Reginald Radcliffe-Brown and Bronislaw Malinowski.  It was also the work that inspired Claude Levi-Strauss to move his intellectual interest from philosophy to anthropology.

Kinship 
Lowie influenced the discipline of social anthropology through his use of a system to distinguish kinship relationships: he identified four main systems, which differed based on the names of the relatives of the first ascending generation, i.e. the parent generation. His Classification Scheme was slightly modified by George P. Murdock by dividing one of Lowie's four systems into a further three types.

Honours 
Lowie was give honorary membership of a number of societies such as the Royal Anthropological Institute of Great Britain, the Instituto do Cerara in Brazil, the American Philosophical Society and the New York Academy of Science.

Lowie twice served as editor of the American Anthropologist. He also served as chairman of the Division of Anthropology and Psychology of the National Research Council.

Lowie was president of the American Folklore Society from 1916-17. He was elected to the National Academy of Sciences in 1931.

Writings
His principal works include:
 Societies of the Arikara Indians (1914)
 Dances and Societies of the Plains Shoshones (1915)
 Notes on the social Organization and Customs of the Mandan, Hidatsa and Crow Indians (1917)
 Culture and Ethnology (1917)
 Plains Indian Age Societies (1917)
 Myths and Traditions of the Crow Indians (1918)
 The Matrilineal Complex (1919)
 Primitive Society (1919)
 The religion of the Crow Indians (1922)
 The Material Culture of the Crow Indians (1922)
 Crow Indian Art (1922)
 Psychology and Anthropology of Races (1923)
 Primitive Religion (1924)
 The Origin of the State (1927)
 The Crow Indians (1935)
 History of Ethnological Theory (1937)
 The German People (1945)
 Social Organization (1948)
 Towards Understanding Germany (1954)
 Robert H. Lowie, Ethnologist; A Personal Record (1959)

Further reading

References 

American curators
American folklorists
20th-century American educators
Anthropologists of religion
Columbia Graduate School of Arts and Sciences alumni
Austro-Hungarian emigrants to the United States
Austrian Jews
1883 births
1957 deaths
People associated with the American Museum of Natural History
20th-century American non-fiction writers
Linguists of Siouan languages
Members of the United States National Academy of Sciences
Jewish anthropologists
20th-century American anthropologists
American Anthropologist editors
Presidents of the American Folklore Society